WOOF-FM (99.7 FM, "99-7 WOOF-FM") is a radio station licensed to serve Dothan, Alabama, United States.  The station, established in September 1964, is owned by WOOF, Inc.  WOOF-FM is a sister station of WOOF (AM) 560.

The station's signal originates from a  tower two miles (3 km) east of Dothan and reaches Southeast Alabama, Southwest Georgia, and Northwest Florida.  This Webb, Alabama, site has been operational since 1985. A studio backup in Dothan, Alabama has 50,000 watts on a  tower. WOOF-FM is responsible for the activation of the Emergency Alert System for the 9th area in Alabama.

Programming
WOOF-FM broadcasts an adult contemporary format.

References

External links
 WOOF-FM official website
 WOOF Radio Group official website
 

OOF-FM
Mainstream adult contemporary radio stations in the United States
Radio stations established in 1964
Dothan, Alabama
1964 establishments in Alabama